Mormodes atropurpurea is a species of orchid native to Panama, Venezuela, and Brazil.

References

External links 

atropurpurea
Orchids of South America
Orchids of Panama
Plants described in 1836